Al-Buraq (also spelled Burak or Braq) is a village in northern Syria, administratively part of the Hama Governorate, located southeast of Hama. Nearby localities include Ayyubiyah and Nisrin to the west, Maarin al-Jabal to the northwest, Surayhin to the north, al-Jinan to the northeast, Taqsis to the southeast and Tell Qartal to the south. According to the Syria Central Bureau of Statistics, al-Buraq had a population of 3,235 in the 2004 census.

In 1838 al-Buraq was classified as khirba ("ruined village.") During the ongoing Syrian civil war, in early February 2013, a reported bombing at a bus stop in the village killed 54 people, all civilians who worked at a nearby military non-lethal supplies factory. No group claimed responsibility for the attack.

References

Bibliography

 

Populated places in Hama District